Gerd Warken (born 5 March 1951) is a German former football player and manager.

References

1951 births
Living people
German footballers
Association football forwards
2. Bundesliga players
FC 08 Homburg players
SV Röchling Völklingen players
German football managers
1. FC Saarbrücken managers
FC 08 Homburg managers